Joana Juárez (born 5 August 1980) is a Spanish gymnast. She competed at the 1996 Summer Olympics, where she finished 24th in the individual all around.

References

External links
 

1980 births
Living people
Spanish female artistic gymnasts
Olympic gymnasts of Spain
Gymnasts at the 1996 Summer Olympics
Gymnasts from Barcelona
20th-century Spanish women